Andrea Renzullo (born 2 March 1996 in Sundern, North Rhine-Westphalia) is a German singer and was a participant who finished fourth in season 4 of Das Supertalent.

Biography

Early life
Andrea Renzullo was born to Italian parents. Andrea became interested in music, with encouragement from his parents, at six years old.

Das Supertalent

Post-Supertalent
Andrea recorded his first single called "Heal". Andrea brought in Los Angeles-based music producer Klaus Derendorf to work with him on his first single. "Heal" came out on 18 March 2011. In 2014, he released his second single "Ricomincerò". In 2017, he participated in Deutschland sucht den Superstar and made it to the top-16. He couldn't take part in the liveshows because of a contract issue. In 2020, he released his new single "Million miles" (feat. JSUNT & JORN). In 2021, the single "L'amore cos'è" (feat. Giusy Trifino) followed. In 2023, he competed again in Deutschland sucht den Superstar and made it to the Top-25.

Discography

Singles

Sources

External links
 Andrea Renzullo's Official site
 Andrea Renzullo's final appearance on clipfish

1996 births
People from Sundern
German people of Italian descent
Das Supertalent participants
Living people
21st-century German male singers